Al Said Mustafa Ahmad Abu Al Kheir (Arabic: السيد مصطفى أحمد أبو الخير) is an Egyptian lawyer and writer, specialized in legal literature, and author of many research papers and published books.

Education 
He obtained a Bachelor of Laws from the Faculty of Law at Zagazig University in 1983. He then obtained a master of law degree in public international law in 1997 from the Faculty of Law at Ain Shams University, and a PhD in public international law from the Faculty of Law at Zagazig University in 2005 with a thesis entitled “The General Theory of Military Blocs According to the Rules of Public International Law” (Original title: alnazariat aleamat liltakatulat aleaskariat wfqan liqawaeid alqanun alduwalii aleama). He also got a diploma in international law in 1990 and another diploma in public law in 1997.

Career 
He worked as a lawyer from 1984 until 2002, when he retired early, to begin his work as a freelance lawyer before the Court of Cassation, the Supreme Constitutional Court, the Supreme Administrative Court and the Supreme Values in 2002. And Academically, he is an academic supervisor at the International Academy of Studies and the Faculty of International Law at the Scandinavian University in Norway . He also worked as a lecturer in international law and international relations at the National Defense College at Nasser Military Academy in Cairo, and in public international law, international organizations and international relations at the Faculty of Law of Omar Al-Mukhtar University in Libya.

Works

Scientific research 
·      The Iraq-Iran conflict (first Gulf War) according to the rules of public international law, 1989

·      The principle of the right to self-determination and its application to the Palestinian people, research submitted to the General Bar Association in Egypt, 1990

·      Criminal responsibility for crimes against the environment, research presented to the Egyptian Association of Criminal Law, 1992

·      Law and human rights, research presented to the General Bar, 1994

·      Extent of the Supreme Constitutional Court's Jurisdiction to Decide on the Validity of Membership in the People's Assembly, 1997

·      The political philosophy of His Majesty and Highness King Abdulaziz Al Saud, a paper presented to the Saudi Consulate in Suez on the occasion of the National Day of the Kingdom of Saudi Arabia, 2000

·      The Waqf and its Political and Social Effects, Research Presented to the Waqf Foundation in Kuwait, 2001.

·      Law No. (1) of 2000 and its Legal Effects, Research Presented to the General Bar, 2001.

·      Customary Marriage in Sharia and Law, Research Presented to the General Bar Association, 2002

·      A legal study on the subpoena for the chairman and editor-in-chief of Al-Ahram Press Foundation, 2002.

·      The Role of Law, Legitimacy and Human Rights in Supporting Arab Right, Research Presented to the Permanent Office of Asian and African Writers in Cairo, 2002

·      The impact of the World Trade Organization (GATT) on the Arab region, 2003

·      The theory of war between Islamic law and contemporary international law, research submitted to the International Commission for Scientific Miracles in the Book and the Sunnah, 2006

·      Violation of international legitimacy in Guantanamo, research published in the Journal of International Politics, Center for Political and Strategic Studies, Al-Ahram Press Foundation, Cairo, 2006

·      Private education between rejection and acceptance, research published in the Journal of Sultan Qaboos University in Oman, issue file, 2006

·      International legitimacy and Guantanamo Bay, research in the Journal of Law issued by the College of Law, University of Aden, Yemen Arab Republic, issue fourteen, 2007

·      Embassies of the Sovereign Military Order of the Knights of Malta and Contemporary International Law, 2007

·      Legal Aspects of Private International Military and Security Companies in Contemporary International Law, 2007

·      National liberation movements in contemporary international law

·      Legal protection for the consumer, a research published in the Kingdom of Saudi Arabia in the Economic Journal

·      Some of Sudan's internal crises and contemporary international law, a research that will be published in the Journal of Law, College of Law, Kuwait University

·      Legal and Policy Aspects of International Private Military Companies

Books

Memberships 
·      Member of the General Secretariat of the Arab and Islamic Gathering to Support the Choice of Resistance, Beirut

·      Member of the Scientific Advisory Committee of the Encyclopedia of Scientific Miracles in the Qur’an and Sunnah

·      Member of the International Commission for Scientific Miracles in the Qur’an and Sunnah

·      Member of the International Coalition to Combat Impunity, Beirut

·      Member of the General Secretariat of the National Alliance to Support Arab and Islamic Resistance, Beirut

·      Member of the Scientific Advisory Board of the Nadwa Journal for Legal Studies, Algeria

·      Member of the advisory board of the Law Journal, Faculty of Law, University of Jerash, Jordan

·      Member of the scientific committee of the Jill Research Center for Human Rights

·      Faculty Member, Faculty of Law and Politics, Department of Law, Ibn Rushd University, The Netherlands

·      Member of the Islamic Bar Association of the Organization of the Islamic Conference

·      Member of the Scientific Advisory Board of the Journal of Jurisprudence and Legal Nawazil in Laghouat, Algeria, issued by the Research Center in Islamic Sciences and Civilization

References 

20th-century Egyptian writers
21st-century Egyptian writers
1957 births
Living people
Zagazig University alumni
Ain Shams University alumni